Imir may refer to:
 Imir, Ardabil
 Eymir, Zanjan
 Ymir, a being in Norse mythology